The Faribault County Courthouse in Blue Earth, Minnesota, United States, is listed on the National Register of Historic Places.  The building was completed in December 1892 at a cost of $70,000.  Materials included Kasota limestone, sand from the Blue Earth River bottoms, red brick above the rusticated sandstone ground floor, and clay tile for the roof.  The arches at the entrance rest on short columns with foliated capitals, a hallmark of the Richardsonian Romanesque style.  Between the arches is a gargoyle in the form of a satyr's head.  The most prominent feature is a seven-story tower on the corner.

References

Buildings and structures in Faribault County, Minnesota
County courthouses in Minnesota
Courthouses on the National Register of Historic Places in Minnesota
Richardsonian Romanesque architecture in Minnesota
National Register of Historic Places in Faribault County, Minnesota